Dos de Abril (April 2) is a south western department of Chaco Province in Argentina.

The provincial subdivision has a population of about 7,500 inhabitants in an area of  1,594 km2, and its capital city is Hermoso Campo, which is located around 1,100 km from the Capital federal.

Settlements
Hermoso Campo
Itín
Zuberbühler

References

External links
Hermoso Campo Municipal Website

Departments of Chaco Province